Phreatobacter is a genus of bacteria from the class of Alphaproteobacteria.

References

Bacteria genera
Hyphomicrobiales